Hanno Blaschke (22 April 1927 – 18 November 2017) was a German baritone and professor of singing. Blaschke most recently held a professorship for singing at the University of Music and Performing Arts Munich.

Life 
Born in Danzig, Blaschke took private singing lessons with Kammersänger Robert Büssel in Dresden. There he experienced the Bombing of Dresden. He studied in Breslau, Warsaw and Sopot. He subsequently worked as a concert singer and singing teacher and gained international renown. His special inclination to promote young talent led him first to Warsaw (assistant to Ada Sari). In 1961, he began teaching at the Hochschule für Musik in Munich, which appointed him full professor in 1975. Until his retirement in 1992, he trained numerous singers who went on to international careers. He was in demand as a leader of master classes and as a juror worldwide until his death.

Honours 
 Order of Merit of the Federal Republic of Germany am Bande, "as one of the essential music educators in the German-speaking world". (15 October 1981)
 Bundesverdienstkreuz 1. Klasse (27 August 1998)
 Medal of Honour of the Munich University of Music and Theatre (2006)

References

External links 
 
 

German baritones
Academic staff of the University of Music and Performing Arts Munich
Officers Crosses of the Order of Merit of the Federal Republic of Germany
1927 births
2017 deaths
People from the Free City of Danzig
Musicians from Gdańsk